Warface is a free-to-play online first-person shooter video game developed by Crytek Kiev, co-produced by Crytek Seoul, and published by My.com. The full version of the game was released on October 21, 2013 as playable in North America and Europe. The game was developed with Crytek's in-house CryEngine 3. Warface centers around online firefights in player versus player (PvP) matches, with microtransactions allowing players to purchase weapons, equipment, and cosmetic gear. The Xbox 360 port, which was developed by Crytek UK, was discontinued in February 2015. The console version of the game was relaunched for the PlayStation 4 and Xbox One in 2018 and on the Nintendo Switch in 2020. Members of the game's development team split from Crytek Kiev in February 2019 to form a new development studio, Blackwood Games, who will handle future development duties for Warface. A tactical shooter spin-off game named Warface: Breakout was released on 26 May 2020 for the PlayStation 4 and Xbox One.

Gameplay

Classes and weapons 
Players can choose between five different classes: Sniper, Rifleman, Engineer, Medic, or SED. Each class has its own specific combat role, with Medics reviving fallen and healing injured teammates, Engineers restoring and repairing armor and being able to revive SED's, Riflemen providing additional ammunition, SED's for suppressive fire and eliminating large groups of enemies in a short amount of time, and Snipers for engaging in long-range firefights.

Each class comes has its own unique weapons and equipment, often split into two categories. Riflemen can choose between a variety of assault rifles and light machine guns, and have the ability to distribute ammunition to themselves and other players. Snipers can wield bolt-action and semi-automatic marksman and sniper rifles. Medics have access to automatic and pump action shotguns, as well as the ability to heal and revive teammates. Engineers can use SMGs and personal defense weapons, and can replenish armor, place explosive mines, revive SED's and quickly interact with explosives. SED's however, are different as they have access to heavy weaponry, as well as a grenade launcher that does medium damage along with a flash effect.

Every class carries a secondary firearm, and an additional melee weapon. Each soldier's tool belt is supplied with a hand grenade, and can be modified or expanded with extra smoke or flash-bang grenades. The Engineer can also carry anti-personnel mines. Weapons have customization slots that can be used to outfit a firearm with scopes, bipods, handles, flash guards, and suppressors.

Game modes 
Players can compete online in PvP matches. [Such as:Team Death Match, Free For All, Storm,and many more.] Or combine their efforts against AI-controlled enemies in PvE battles, as well as Spec Ops. As players complete matches and missions, they can earn Experience Points, Warface Dollars, and Vendor Points. The amount of rewards earned varies depending on the number of players, the mission played, the mission's duration, the amount of checkpoints, and other criteria.

In-game currency 
Warface Dollars can be used to rent weapons, and purchase armor and other items. Experience Points allow each player increase their personal Rank (level) in the game. Vendor Points are used to progress through the Arsenal tree, which features three categories of items that are unlocked in line with the player's in-game progression: Weapons, Attachments, and Equipment. VIP Booster Packs, which can be purchased from the in-game store, allow the player to earn additional Experience Points, Warface Dollars, and Vendor Points after a match. Another form of in-game currency, Kredits,(Ks) are a premium currency that allow the purchase of the VIP Booster packs, player skins, bundles, special weapons, and more. Kredits are purchased with real-world money and are often required to purchase high-end items including but not limited to: golden guns, skinned guns, boxes, and armor.

Development 

In August 2011, Crytek announced that Warface would be released for PC in Western markets in 2012. In February 2012, the game was announced to be published by Nexon in South Korea and Taiwan. The game was released for its open beta stage on Mail.Ru's game client in Russia. In July 2012, Trion Worlds announced itself as the publisher of the game in the United States, New Zealand, Turkey, Australia, and Europe. The closed beta version of Warface was released in western markets on 17 January 2013.

On 28 August 2013, Crytek announced that Warface would be released for the Xbox 360 in early 2014. The game was released for the Xbox 360 on 22 April 2014. On 3 December 2014, Crytek announced that it would cease support for the Xbox 360 version of the game, with support being fully withdrawn on 1 February 2015.

Warface was released for PlayStation 4 on 14 August 2018 and for Xbox One on 25 September 2018. In November 2018, the game added a Battle Pass to the PC version of the game known as 'The Syndicate'.

In February 2019, the game's development team formed a new studio, Blackwood Games, which would take over further development of Warface from Crytek Kiev.

Reception

Warface received mixed reviews from critics, according to review aggregator Metacritic. Gaming Trend said that while the Xbox One version of Warface was not the most unique game, it was fun and approachable. TheXboxHub praised the game for being "truly free-to-play" and not requiring players to spend real money to remain competitive, while providing "highly enjoyable online focused gameplay" and plenty of modes.

Awards 

 'Best Social/Casual/Online Game' from Gamescom 2012
 The Inven Award: BEST FPS Game G-Star 2012

Notes

References

External links

 
 Warface on Crytek's website

2013 video games
CryEngine games
Crytek games
First-person shooter multiplayer online games
Free-to-play video games
Microsoft games
Multiplayer video games
Nintendo Switch games
PlayStation 4 games
Windows games
Video games developed in Ukraine
Video games containing battle passes
Xbox 360 games
Xbox One games
Xbox One X enhanced games
My.Games games